Tilo von Berlepsch (30 December 1913 – 8 April 1991) was a German actor. He appeared in more than 90 films and television shows between 1949 and 1977. He came from the Berlepsch family and was a grandson of the ornithologist Hans Hermann Carl Ludwig von Berlepsch. He made his acting debut in Berlin in 1933. After 1945 he was able to continue his long stage career at numerous German theaters.

Partial filmography

 Love '47 (1949) - Vetter Fritz
 Amico (1949) - Freddy Müller
 Immortal Beloved (1951) - Kurt von der Risch
 Veronika, die Magd (1951)
 Der Tag vor der Hochzeit (1952) - (uncredited)
 Have Sunshine in Your Heart (1953) - Arzt
 Hocuspocus (1953)
 Under the Stars of Capri (1953) - Claus
 Königliche Hoheit (1953) - Adjutant Graf Schellenberg
 Dein Mund verspricht mir Liebe (1954) - Kriminalrat Zorn
 The Immenhof Girls (1955) - Gerichtsvollzieher
 Mamitschka (1955) - Baron Hiebel
 The Barrings (1955) - Emanuel von Eyff
 Drei Mädels vom Rhein (1955)
 Die wilde Auguste (1956) - Chefredakteur
 Friederike von Barring (1956) - Emanuel von Eyff
  (1957) - Freiherr Professor von Makkeprang
 Lilli - ein Mädchen aus der Großstadt (1958) - Schiffarzt
 Rosemary (1958) - Oelsen
 Liebe kann wie Gift sein (1958)
 Piefke, der Schrecken der Kompanie (1958) - Hauptmann Tilo von Weihrauch
 My Ninety Nine Brides (1958) - Konsul Hale
 Labyrinth (1959) - Graf
 Old Heidelberg (1959) - Kammerherr von Metzing
 Beloved Augustin (1960) - Herr von Ziwny
 Until Money Departs You (1960) - Dr. Stumpf
 The Marriage of Mr. Mississippi (1961) - Außenminister (uncredited)
 The Bread of Those Early Years (1962) - Vater Fendrich
 Moral 63 (1963) - Dr. Merkel, Ermittlungsrichter
 Der Hexer (1964) - Rezeptionist (uncredited)
 DM-Killer (1965) - Consul Moebius, Inge's Father
 Who Wants to Sleep? (1965)
 Long Legs, Long Fingers (1966) - Staatsanwalt
 The Hunchback of Soho (1966) - Polizeiarzt (uncredited)
 Tattoo (1967) - Lohmann's Brother
 The Monk with the Whip (1967) - Polizeiarzt
 The Hound of Blackwood Castle (1968) - Lord Henry Beverton
 Komm nur, mein liebstes Vögelein (1968) - Baron
 The Man with the Glass Eye (1969) - Mr. Randel
 Come to Vienna, I'll Show You Something! (1970) - Talleyrand
 Gentlemen in White Vests (1970) - Juwelier Max Hase (uncredited)
 Die Feuerzangenbowle (1970) - Diener
 Bleib sauber, Liebling (1971)
 Our Willi Is the Best (1971) - Briefmarkensammler (uncredited)
 The Flying Classroom (1973) - Direktor Grünkern
 When Mother Went on Strike (1974)
  (1974)
 Rosemary's Daughter (1976) - Fürst

References

External links

1913 births
1991 deaths
German male film actors
20th-century German male actors